Hon. Justice Sobhitha Rajakaruna (also known as R.M. Sobhitha Rajakaruna) is a sitting Judge of the Court of Appeal of Sri Lanka who was appointed by the President Gotabaya Rajapaksa.

Sobitha was educated at Nalanda College, Colombo and was the Head Prefect in 1985/86. He is a graduate of University of Colombo, Sri Lanka Law College and National University of Singapore.

References

 New Appellate Court Judge sworn in
 Rajakaruna sworn in as Appeal Court Judge
 Gihan Pilapitiya’s writ petition to be taken up on May 4
 New Nalanda ‘85 Group Office-bearers

Sinhalese judges
Sinhalese lawyers
20th-century Sri Lankan people
21st-century Sri Lankan people
Alumni of Sri Lanka Law College
Alumni of Nalanda College, Colombo
Living people
Court of Appeal of Sri Lanka judges
Year of birth missing (living people)